Squab may also refer to:

 A young domestic pigeon (a baby pigeon or nestling), a pigeon derived from the rock pigeon
 Squab (food), the meat from such a bird
 Squab pie, a dish made from lamb and apples
 A cushion for a chair or couch; a short sofa
 Squab, Squab, Squab, Squab, Squab, episode of TV show Two and a Half Men

See also 
 Squib (disambiguation)